Javorje pri Blagovici is a small settlement in the hills northeast of Blagovica in the Municipality of Lukovica in the eastern part of the Upper Carniola region of Slovenia.

References

External links 
Javorje pri Blagovici on Geopedia

Populated places in the Municipality of Lukovica